Clelandella is a genus of sea snails, marine gastropod mollusks in the family Trochidae, the top snails.

Species
Species within the genus Clelandella include:
 Clelandella artilesi Vilvens, Swinnen & Deniz, 2011 
 Clelandella azorica Gofas, 2005
 Clelandella dautzenbergi Gofas, 2005
 Clelandella madeirensis Gofas, 2005
 Clelandella miliaris (Brocchi, 1814)
 Clelandella myriamae Gofas, 2005
 Clelandella perforata Gofas, 2005
 Species brought into synonymy 
 Clelandella clelandi (W. Wood, 1828): synonym of  Clelandella miliaris (Brocchi, 1814)
 Clelandella infuscata (Gould, 1861): synonym of Kanekotrochus infuscatus (Gould, 1861)

References

 Gofas, S.; Le Renard, J.; Bouchet, P. (2001). Mollusca. in: Costello, M.J. et al. (eds), European Register of Marine Species: a check-list of the marine species in Europe and a bibliography of guides to their identification. Patrimoines Naturels. 50: 180-213. 
 Howson, C.M.; Picton, B.E. (1997). The species directory of the marine fauna and flora of the British Isles and surrounding seas. Ulster Museum Publication, 276. The Ulster Museum: Belfast, UK. . vi, 508
 Vilvens C., Swinnen F. & Deniz Guerra F. (2011)  A new species of Clelandella (Gastropoda: Trochoidea: Cantharidinae) from Western Sahara. Novapex 12(1-2): 49-55. [Published 10 March 2011]

 
Trochidae
Gastropod genera